The Manawatū Gorge is a steep-sided gorge formed by the Manawatū River in the North Island of New Zealand. It lies to the northeast of Palmerston North. Its western end is near the small town of Ashhurst and its eastern end is close to the town of Woodville.

As the one of the few links between the eastern and western North Island, the gorge is an important transport link, with the Palmerston North–Gisborne Line passing through the gorge, as well as State Highway 3; the road has been closed since 2017. Recreationally, the gorge is part of the Manawatū Gorge Scenic Reserve, with various walking tracks through the surrounding native bush.

Like many important geographic features in New Zealand, the creation and exploration of Manawatū Gorge is an embedded part of traditional Māori history. According to tradition, the first Māori to discover the gorge was Whātonga, an explorer from the Kurahaupō canoe, who found the gorge in about the 12th century. Europeans began to traverse the Manawatū Gorge around the 1840s; in 1842 Bishop George Augustus Selwyn and Chief Justice William Martin passed through the gorge to reach the Wairarapa.

Etymology
The Manawatū Gorge takes its name from the river which cuts through it, the Manawatū River. The river's name, which means 'heart standing still', is derived from the words manawa, meaning heart, and tū, meaning coming to a halt. This comes from traditional Māori history, in which it is said that Haunui-a-nanaia uttered the phrase when he caught sight of the river in his search for his wife Wairaka.

Te Āpiti is the Māori name for the gorge, which is usually translated to mean 'the narrowing', or 'the narrow passage'. The gorge was also sometimes given the name Te Au-rere-a-te-tonga.

Geography
The Manawatu Gorge is significant because, unlike most gorges, the Manawatu River is a water gap, that is it runs directly through the surrounding ranges from one side to the other.  This was caused by the ranges moving upwards at the same time as the gorge was eroded by the river, instead of the more usual erosion of an already existing range.

The Manawatu River is the only river in New Zealand that starts its journey in the Tararua District on one side of the main divide, and finishes it on the other side near Foxton in the Tasman Sea.

Transport

The road through the Manawatu Gorge, State Highway 3, is on the south side of the river, and was completed in 1872. It was the primary link between the two sides of the lower North Island, before being abandoned in 2017 due to the number of slips.

The road through the Manawatu Gorge had a history of sometimes being closed by slips, especially following inclement weather.

A single track rail connection was established on the northern side of the gorge; it was completed in 1891 and is now part of the Palmerston North–Gisborne Line.  The rail connection is mainly used by goods trains; there are currently no scheduled passenger rail services through the gorge.  Occasional railway excursions, typically with steam trains, also make use of the scenic Manawatu Gorge Railway line with its two tunnels and several small bridges.

The Old Gorge Cemetery lies on the north side of the Manawatu Gorge.  Public access is available, but the cemetery was closed many years ago to further burials.  The road is located just a few kilometres out of Woodville on the north side of the gorge.

In 2011 the gorge was closed after several massive landslips. It did not reopen until August 2012, and parts of the highway were still limited to one lane.
In October 2012 it was temporarily closed so contractors could destroy large rocks that posed a threat to traffic. Restoration was completed in November 2012.

SH3 was blocked again for one month by further slips after severe weather on 9 April 2015.

In April 2017, the Manawatu Gorge was closed again due to a large slip. Contractors were pulled out of clearing the slip in July 2017 due to ongoing geological movement in the hill, closing the road indefinitely.

A further slip in July 2017 at the Ashhurst end of the Manawatu Gorge left an additional 10,000 cubic metres of rock on the road. Waka Kotahi NZ Transport Agency decided to close the Gorge route permanently. The authority investigated long-term options to bypass or replace the gorge route, with their final list having four options.

The chosen new route option, delayed from December 2017 and announced in March 2018, will be above the Gorge, but below the Saddle Road, and will bypass Ashurst.

Manawatu Gorge Track

A  tramping track, the Manawatu Gorge Track, runs parallel to the gorge on the south side through native bush.

The walking track passes several lookout points, one of which is above the site of the 2015 landslide, aptly called the "Big Slip Lookout". The majority of the track leads through native bush, with the lookouts offering views overlooking the gorge and towards the Te Apiti Wind Farm continuing on the hills north of the gorge.

The statue was funded by the Manawatu Gorge Biodiversity stakeholder group and is made of steel. It was lowered to its location in the bush by helicopter, and blessed at a dawn ceremony on 11 April 2014. The artwork on the sculpture features hammerhead shark patterns and depicts elements of the story of Whatonga's sea voyage, as well as emblems of all of the Manawatu Gorge biodiversity project stakeholders.

Up to date information on all walking and biking tracks is available on the Te Apiti website.

See also
 Te Apiti Wind Farm

References

2011 landslides in Manawatu Gorge

External links

Te Apiti – Manawatu Gorge

Landforms of Manawatū-Whanganui
Canyons and gorges of New Zealand
Water gaps
Tararua Range